Pornthep Chankai (born November 11, 1984) is a Thai professional footballer who plays as a centre-back for Thai League 3 club Sisaket United.

Honours
Nongbua Pitchaya
 Thai League 2: 2020-21

References

External links

1984 births
Living people
Pornthep Chankai
Association football defenders
Pornthep Chankai
Pornthep Chankai
Pornthep Chankai